OUAT may refer to:

 Once Upon a Time (disambiguation)
 Orissa University of Agriculture and Technology, a public Indian agricultural university
 Once Upon a Time (TV series)